"A Losing Streak" is the third episode of series 2 of the BBC sitcom, Only Fools and Horses. It was first broadcast on 4 November 1982. In the episode, Del Boy plays a high-stakes game of poker with Boycie. Also, this is the only episode in the series in which Boycie serves as an antagonist.

Synopsis
Del Boy, Rodney, and Grandad are making cheap perfume to earn additional income after Del has been losing a lot of money in a series of poker games with Boycie, which Del attributes to a "losing streak". Grandad shows Del a double-headed coin that he got off a Scottish man during the war, and advises Del to use it against Boycie. According to Grandad, the man said: "I want you to have something to remember me by, Trotter. Take me lucky coin."

Later, at The Nag's Head, the Trotter Brothers and Trigger talk about Del's bad luck until Boycie walks in. Del challenges him to a winner-takes-all poker game at 8:30pm at Nelson Mandela House, much to Rodney's disapproval. But first, Del and Boycie have a bet on the next customer who walks in ordering a pint or not. A large Irishman enters and orders a dry Martini and a slim line tonic, thus costing Del £20. Del tries to get his money back by flipping the double-headed coin for it, but Boycie calls heads.

Del explains to Rodney the reason why he has to play the poker game: Rodney does not remember the day their father Reg left home after their mother Joan died, because he was only an infant at the time. Del came home that evening and found that Reg had packed his bags and abandoned them. He left them with nothing, and stole Rodney's piggy bank and Del's birthday cake. The only thing that Reg did not get was the money Joan had left her sons, because Del hid it. From that day forward, Del swore that he would never run away from anything in his life, and that is why he has to play the poker game with Boycie.

At 8:30pm in Nelson Mandela House, Del has everything set up for the poker game. Grandad bravely lends Del some money to put up during the game. Rodney tells his family that Boycie and Trigger have arrived. Del and Boycie flip a coin to decide whose pack of cards they will use. Del flips the double-headed coin and Boycie calls heads again, thus they use Boycie's cards. Throughout the evening, Boycie easily beats both Del and Trigger with his marked cards.

As Trigger pulls out, Del and Boycie agree to a no-limits game, and Boycie seemingly trumps Del with a bet of £1000. Del wagers all his jewellery, Trigger's car (which Boycie sold to him), the stereo, the TVs, and everything in the flat just to see Boycie's cards. Boycie reveals that he has four Kings, while Del has only got two pairs. As Boycie prepares to leave, Del reminds him that according to the rules, all cards must be shown before the winnings are collected. Boycie agrees, and Del shows everyone else that he has in fact got two pairs of Aces, giving him a winning hand. The conversation between Del and Boycie then runs as follows:

With that said, Del and Rodney begin collecting the money. As Boycie prepares to leave downcast, Rodney convinces Del that he is now on a winning streak, so Del decides to flip a coin with Boycie for £200, but with Rodney calling for him. Rodney, forgetting about the double-headed coin, calls tails.

Episode cast

Notes 

 The episode title was a pun on the term "winning streak".

Episode concept
The idea for the script was based on John Sullivan's father's gambling sessions.

References

External links

1982 British television episodes
Only Fools and Horses (series 2) episodes
Television episodes about gambling